Jalen Milroe (born December 13, 2002) is an American football quarterback for the Alabama Crimson Tide.

High school career 
Milroe attended Tompkins High School in Katy, Texas. As a junior, he threw for 2,689 yards and 29 touchdowns adding an additional eight touchdowns rushing and 378 yards. In 2020 as a senior, he passed for 1,136 yards and 13 touchdowns. During his high school career, Milroe tallied 3,825 passing yards, 559 rushing yards, and 53 total touchdowns leading Tompkins to over 30 wins in three seasons. He originally committed to Texas before deciding to switch to the University of Alabama.

College career 
During his freshman year at Alabama, Milroe was the backup to sophomore quarterback Bryce Young throughout the 2021 season. As a result Milroe was redshirted. During the season he appeared in four games completing three passes for 41 yards and a touchdown, while rushing for 57 yards on 15 carries. He began the 2022 season remaining the backup to Bryce Young. In Alabama's Spring Game, Milroe completed 11 passes for 149 yards and a touchdown. In his first appearance of the season, he recorded eight completions, 76 yards, a touchdown, and an interception. He would make minor appearances in relief against Louisiana Monroe and Vanderbilt, before he would take over as the quarterback in week four against Arkansas after an injury to Bryce Young. Milroe would throw and rush for a touchdown each, leading Alabama to a 49–26 victory. One week later, he would make his first career start against Texas A&M, throwing for three touchdowns and recording three turnovers in a 24–20 win.

Statistics

Personal life 
Milroe is a Christian and was baptized in 2022.

References

External links 
 Alabama Crimson Tide bio

Living people
Alabama Crimson Tide football players
American football quarterbacks
People from Katy, Texas
Sportspeople from Texas
African-American players of American football
Players of American football from Texas
Christians from Texas
Year of birth missing (living people)